The Great Escape is a 1963 American war adventure film starring Steve McQueen, James Garner and Richard Attenborough and featuring James Donald, Charles Bronson, Donald Pleasence, James Coburn, Hannes Messemer, David McCallum, Karl-Otto Alberty, Gordon Jackson, John Leyton and Angus Lennie. It was filmed in Panavision, and its musical score was composed by Elmer Bernstein.

The film is based on Paul Brickhill's 1950 non-fiction book of the same name, a firsthand account of the mass escape by British Commonwealth prisoners of war from German POW camp Stalag Luft III in Sagan (now Żagań, Poland), in the Nazi Germany province of Lower Silesia. The film depicts a heavily fictionalized version of the escape, with numerous compromises for its commercial appeal, such as focusing more on American involvement in the escape.

The Great Escape was made by The Mirisch Company, released by United Artists, and produced and directed by John Sturges. The film had its Royal World Premiere at the Odeon Leicester Square in London's West End on 20 June 1963. The Great Escape emerged as one of the highest-grossing films of the year, winning McQueen the award for Best Actor at the Moscow International Film Festival, and is now considered a classic. The Great Escape is also noted for its motorcycle chase and jump scene, which is considered one of the best stunts ever performed.

Plot
In late 1942, having expended enormous resources on repeatedly recapturing Allied POWs, the Nazi German armed forces move the most determined to Stalag Luft III, a new, max-security prisoner-of-war camp supervised by Luftwaffe Colonel von Luger. The prisoners establish an escape committee, the "X" Organization, led by "Big X", RAF Squadron Leader (and former Gestapo prisoner) Roger Bartlett. With the tacit approval of British Group Captain Ramsey—the most senior officer of any nationality in the camp, and therefore the prisoners' de facto leader—Bartlett proposes an audacious plan: to tunnel below the fence of the camp into the forest, to break out 250 of the men. He knows that, realistically, most of them will be recaptured—but the Germans will have to pull significant manpower away from the front for the search, aiding the Allied war effort. 

The men organize into teams, simultaneously working on three tunnels: "Tom", "Dick", and "Harry". American Flight Lieutenant Bob Hendley can find anything, from a camera to identity cards. Australian Flying Officer Sedgwick makes tools like picks and bellows for pumping air into the tunnels. Flight Lieutenants Danny Welinski and Willie Dickes are in charge of digging the tunnels. Flight Lieutenant Andy MacDonald, Bartlett's second-in-command, gathers and provides intelligence.

Lieutenant Commander Eric Ashley-Pitt of the Royal Navy devises a method of hiding dirt from the tunnels under the guards' noses. Flight Lieutenant Griffith creates civilian outfits from scavenged cloth for the POWs to wear after the escape. Dai Nimmo and Haynes are in charge of diverting the guards' attention to other things in the camp in order to pull off the more risky parts of the operation unnoticed. Sorren is in charge of security. Forging papers is handled by Flight Lieutenant Colin Blythe. The work noise is covered by the prisoner choir, led by Flight Lieutenant Dennis Cavendish, who also does surveys to measure the tunnel's route.

On June 20, 1943, Bartlett asks USAAF Captain Virgil Hilts, a legendarily prolific escapee who is repeatedly punished with solitary time in the "cooler", to help in the escape by getting out through the barbed wire, scouting out the area, and then allowing himself to be recaptured so he can then draw a map for the X Organization. Hilts refuses. During his first stretch in the cooler at the camp, Hilts also strikes up a friendship with Scottish RAF Flying Officer Archie Ives.

As "Tom" nears completion soonest, Bartlett orders "Dick" and "Harry" sealed off. After hoarding potatoes from the allotments, Hilts, Hendley, and American Second Lieutenant Goff concoct moonshine from a home made still and celebrate the Fourth of July with the entire camp. In the midst of the celebration, the guards discover "Tom". As the POWs react with dismay, a despondent Ives frantically climbs the barbed wire fence and is shot dead.

Hilts, shaken by Ives' death, changes his mind. He escapes from the camp and then lets himself get captured, returning with reconnaissance info on the surrounding terrain. Bartlett switches the prisoners' efforts to "Harry". After experiencing multiple tunnel collapses, Danny snaps and confides in Willie that despite his extensive tunneling experience he is actually claustrophobic. He comes close to attempting to cut through the fence, but Willie saves him from being shot by talking him down at the last minute.

Blythe discovers that he is going blind due to progressive myopia; Hendley takes it upon himself to be Blythe's guide in the escape.

The last part of the tunnel is completed on the scheduled night, March 24, 1944. However, the tunnel is  short of the treeline. The prisoners take advantage of an air raid blackout to carefully climb out of the hole one-by-one and make for the forest, guided by Hilts signalling when the coast is clear by tugging on a rope. 76 prisoners—including Bartlett, MacDonald, Hendley, Blythe, Hilts, Ashley-Pitt, Welinski, Dickes, Sedgwick, Cavendish, Nimmo and Haynes—escape. 

However, Cavendish slips and falls after exiting the tunnel, drawing a guard's attention. As the guard stands next to the hole, otherwise oblivious, an impatient Griffith sticks his head out before Hilts signals the all-clear and is captured immediately.

The 76 POWs flee in different directions. Cavendish hitch hikes in a truck but is delivered directly to the authorities at a nearby castle, where he finds Haynes, disguised as a German soldier, also captured. Hendley and Blythe steal a plane to fly over the Swiss border, but the engine fails, and they crash-land; Blythe is shot and dies, while Hendley is recaptured.

Hilts steals a motorcycle and heads for the German-Swiss border, pursued by German soldiers. He begins jumping barbed-wire fences but soldiers shoot out the bike's tire, and he is recaptured. Ashley-Pitt is shot and killed at a railway station when he causes a distraction (by murdering Priessen, a Gestapo officer who recognised Barlett) to save MacDonald and Bartlett but they are recaptured after a Gestapo officer tricks them into speaking English.

On the orders of Adolf Hitler the Gestapo murder 48 of the prisoners, including Bartlett, MacDonald, Cavendish and Haynes, on the pretext that they were trying to escape, bringing the total dead to 50. Only 3 POWs successfully escape. Welinski and Dickes steal a rowboat and proceed downstream to a port, where they board a merchant ship bound for Sweden. Sedgwick steals a bicycle then takes a train to France, where the French Resistance assists him in reaching Spain.

Hendley, Nimmo and nine others are returned to the camp. When informed of the dead, Hendley wonders if the cost was worth it, and Ramsey tells him it depends on his point of view. Von Luger is relieved of command as Hilts returns and is sent to the cooler, where he begins planning another escape.

Cast

 Steve McQueen as Captain  'The Cooler King': one of three Americans in the camp, Hilts irritates guards with frequent escape attempts and an irreverent attitude, to the point that he is regularly confined in isolation in the cooler. He has a habit of bouncing a baseball against the cooler cell wall to entertain himself, as he plans an escape attempt. Hilts was based on at least three pilots, David M. Jones, John Dortch Lewis, and Bill Ash.
 James Garner as Flight Lieutenant Bob Hendley 'The Scrounger': an American serving in an RAF Eagle Squadron. He is responsible for finding materials that will be necessary for the POWs during the escape attempt and on the outside.
 Richard Attenborough as Squadron Leader Roger Bartlett 'Big X': an ambitious RAF officer, who has developed an intense hatred for the Nazis following his stay with the Gestapo. Bartlett, a veteran escaper, is the ringleader, 'Big X', of the camp escape committee, the "X" Organization and declares his intention to organize a massive breakout of 250 men; it is their duty to harass, confound and confuse the enemy.
 James Donald as Group Captain Ramsey 'The SBO': the Senior British Officer and de facto commanding officer of the prisoners.  He serves as an intermediary between the POWs and the Germans. Ramsey is taken aback at Bartlett's plan but supports it. 
 Charles Bronson as Flight Lieutenant Danny Welinski 'Tunnel King': a Polish émigré who escaped Nazi-held Poland and went to England to continue the fight against the Nazis. He suffers from claustrophobia and is fearful of tunnel collapses, primarily coming from his experience of having dug 17 escape tunnels.
 Donald Pleasence as Flight Lieutenant Colin Blythe 'The Forger': a mild-mannered and good-natured master forger with a love of bird-watching who requires paper, inks, a camera, and current travel documents to copy.
 James Coburn as Flying Officer Louis Sedgwick 'The Manufacturer': an Australian officer who constructs objects necessary to implement the escape.
 Hannes Messemer as Oberst von Luger 'The Kommandant': the Commandant of the camp and a senior Luftwaffe officer, von Luger is very civil with the POWs, and is openly anti-Nazi, especially embittered with the SS and Gestapo. When the Gestapo orders that Bartlett receive strict confinement, von Luger makes a passing note of it and instead shows sympathy for Bartlett.
 David McCallum as Lieutenant-Commander Eric Ashley-Pitt 'Dispersal': a Fleet Air Arm officer who finds an ingenious way to get rid of the dirt being brought up from the tunnels.
 Gordon Jackson as Flight Lieutenant Andy MacDonald 'Intelligence': Bartlett's second-in-command in planning the escape.
 John Leyton as Flight Lieutenant Willie Dickes 'Tunnel King': Danny's best friend, who seeks to encourage Danny during his struggles with claustrophobia.
 Angus Lennie as Flying Officer Archie Ives 'The Mole': a Scottish airman who has an intense desire to escape, leading him to the precipice of paranoia.
 Nigel Stock as Flight Lieutenant Dennis Cavendish 'The Surveyor': a Flight Lieutenant who has an important duty for the building of the tunnel.
 Robert Graf as Werner 'The Ferret': a young, naive guard, with whom Hendley forms a friendship, which he exploits as a means of obtaining travel documents and other needed items.
 Jud Taylor as Second Lieutenant Goff: the third American in the camp.
 Hans Reiser as Kuhn: a Gestapo officer who had Bartlett as a prisoner. An ardent Nazi, he orders von Luger that Bartlett be kept under the most restrictive permanent security confinement, which von Luger only makes a note of. He is critical of the Luftwaffe's fair treatment of the prisoners, and believes the camp should be brought under the jurisdiction of the Gestapo and SS. Kuhn warns Bartlett that if he escapes again, he will be shot on his next capture.
 Harry Riebauer as Stabsfeldwebel Strachwitz, the senior NCO amongst the German guards.
 William Russell as Sorren 'Security', a British officer.
 Robert Freitag as Hauptmann Posen, von Luger's adjutant.
 Ulrich Beiger as Preissen: a high-ranking Gestapo official, and an ardent Nazi. He has a condescending attitude and had Bartlett as a prisoner.
 George Mikell as SD Hauptsturmführer Dietrich: one of the SS officers who had Bartlett as a prisoner.
 Lawrence Montaigne as Haynes 'Diversions', a Canadian officer.
 Robert Desmond as Griffith 'Tailor', a British officer responsible for supplying clothes for the POWs for the escape.
 Til Kiwe as Frick
 Heinz Weiss as Kramer
 Tom Adams as Dai Nimmo 'Diversions', a Welsh officer.
 Karl-Otto Alberty as SD Untersturmführer Steinach: one of the SS officers who had Bartlett as a prisoner.

Production

Writing
In 1963, the Mirisch brothers worked with United Artists to adapt Paul Brickhill's 1950 book The Great Escape. Brickhill had been a very minor member of the X Organisation at Stalag Luft III, who acted as one of the "stooges" who monitored German movements in the camp. The story had been adapted as a live TV production, screened by NBC as an episode of The Philco Television Playhouse on January 27, 1951. The live broadcast was praised for engineering an ingenious set design for the live broadcast, including creating the illusion of tunnels. The film's screenplay was adapted by James Clavell, W. R. Burnett, and Walter Newman.

Casting

Steve McQueen has been credited with the most significant performance. Critic Leonard Maltin wrote that "the large, international cast is superb, but the standout is McQueen; it's easy to see why this cemented his status as a superstar". This film established his box-office clout.

Richard Attenborough's Sqn Ldr Roger Bartlett RAF, "Big X", was based on Roger Bushell, the South African-born British POW who was the mastermind of the real Great Escape. This was the film that first brought Attenborough to common notice in the United States. During World War II, Attenborough served in the Royal Air Force. He volunteered to fly with the Film Unit and after further training (where he sustained permanent ear damage) he qualified as a sergeant. He flew on several missions over Europe, filming from the rear gunner's position to record the outcome of Bomber Command sorties. (Richard Harris was originally announced for the role.)

Group Captain Ramsey RAF, "the SBO" (Senior British Officer), was based on Group Captain Herbert Massey, a World War I veteran who had volunteered in World War II. Massey walked with a limp, and in the movie Ramsey walks with a cane. Massey had suffered severe wounds to the same leg in both wars. There would be no escape for him, but as SBO he had to know what was going on. Group Captain Massey was a veteran escaper himself and had been in trouble with the Gestapo. His experience allowed him to offer sound advice to the X-Organisation. Another officer who is likely to have inspired the character of Ramsey was Wing Commander Harry Day.

Flt Lt Colin Blythe RAF, "The Forger", was based on Tim Walenn and played by Donald Pleasence. Pleasence himself had served in the Royal Air Force during World War II. He was shot down and spent a year in German prisoner-of-war camp Stalag Luft I. Charles Bronson had been a gunner in the USAAF and had been wounded, but never shot down. Like his character, Danny Valinski, he suffered from claustrophobia because of his childhood work in a mine. James Garner had been a soldier in the Korean War and was twice wounded. He was a scrounger during that time, as is his character.

Hannes Messemer's Commandant, "Colonel von Luger", was based on Oberst Friedrich Wilhelm von Lindeiner-Wildau. He had been a POW in Russia during World War II and had escaped by walking hundreds of miles to the German border. He was wounded by Russian fire, but was not captured by the Russians. He surrendered to British forces and then spent two years in a POW facility in London known as the London Cage.

Angus Lennie's Flying Officer Archibald Ives, "The Mole", was based on Jimmy Kiddel, who was shot dead while trying to scale the fence.

The film is accurate in showing that only three escapees made home runs, although the people who made them differed from those in the film. The escape of Danny and Willie in the film is based on two Norwegians who escaped by boat to Sweden, Per Bergsland and Jens Müller. The successful escape of James Coburn's Australian character, Sedgwick ("the Manufacturer"), via Spain was based on Dutchman Bram van der Stok. Coburn, an American, was cast in the role of Royal Australian Air Force (RAAF) Flying Officer Louis Sedgwick who was an amalgamation of Flt Lt Albert Hake, an Australian serving in the RAF, the camp's compass maker, and Johnny Travis, the real manufacturer.

Tilman 'Til Kiwe' Kiver played the German guard "Frick", who discovers the escape. Kiwe had been a German paratrooper officer who was captured and held prisoner at a POW camp in Colorado. He made several escape attempts, dyeing his uniform and carrying forged papers. He was captured in the St. Louis train station during one escape attempt. He won the Knight's Cross before his capture and was the cast member who had actually performed many of the exploits shown in the film.

Filming
The film was made on location in Germany at the Bavaria Film Studio in the Munich suburb of Geiselgasteig in rural Bavaria, where sets for the barrack interiors and tunnels were constructed. The camp was built in a clearing of the Perlacher Forst (Perlacher Forest) near the studio. The German town near the real camp was Sagan (now Żagań, Poland); it was renamed Neustadt in the film. Many scenes were filmed in and around the town of Füssen in Bavaria, including its railway station. The nearby district of Pfronten, with its distinctive St. Nikolaus Church and scenic background, also appears often in the film. The first scenes involving the railway were filmed on the Munich–Holzkirchen line at Großhesselohe station ("Neustadt" station in the movie) and near Deisenhofen. Hendley and Blythe's escape from the train was shot on the Munich–Mühldorf railway east of Markt Schwaben. The station where Bartlett, MacDonald and Ashley-Pitt arrive is Füssen station, whereas the scene of Sedgwick (whose theft of a bike was shot in Markt Schwaben) boarding a train was created in Pfronten-Ried station on the Ausserfern Railway. The castle Hendley and Blythe fly by while attempting to escape is Neuschwanstein Castle.

The motorcycle chase scenes with the barbed wire fences were shot on meadows outside Füssen, and the "barbed wire" that Hilts crashes into before being recaptured was simulated by strips of rubber tied around barbless wire, constructed by the cast and crew in their spare time. Insurance concerns prevented McQueen from performing the film's notable motorcycle leap, which was done by his friend and fellow cycle enthusiast Bud Ekins, who resembled McQueen from a distance. When Johnny Carson later tried to congratulate McQueen for the jump during a broadcast of The Tonight Show, McQueen said, "It wasn't me. That was Bud Ekins." However, McQueen and Australian Motocross champion Tim Gibbes both performed the stunt on camera for fun, and according to second unit director Robert Relyea, the stunt in the final cut of the movie could have been performed by any of the three men.  Other parts of the chase were done by McQueen, playing both Hilts and the soldiers chasing him, because of his skill on a motorcycle. The motorcycle was a Triumph TR6 Trophy which was painted to look like a German machine. The restored machine is currently on display at Triumph's factory at Hinckley, England.

Historical accuracy

The film was largely fictional, with changes made to increase its drama and appeal to an American audience, and to serve as vehicle for its box-office stars. Many details of the actual escape attempt were changed for the film, including the roles of American personnel in both the planning and the escape. While the characters are fictitious, they are based on real men, in most cases being composites of several people. The screenwriters significantly increased the involvement of American POWs; a few American officers in the camp initially helped dig the tunnels and worked on the early plans. However, they were moved away seven months before the escape, which ended their involvement. The real escape was by largely British and other Allied personnel, with the exception of American Johnnie Dodge, who was a British officer.

The film omits the crucial role that Canadians played in building the tunnels and in the escape itself. Of the 1,800 or so POWs, 600 were involved in preparations: 150 of those were Canadian. Wally Floody, an RCAF pilot and former miner who was the real-life "tunnel king", was engaged as a technical advisor for the film.

When Ramsey first meets Von Luger, Luger warns him that although the newly arriving prisoners are well-known for wreaking havoc throughout the Reich with their constant camp breakouts, they will have no success at the new camp. Undaunted, Ramsey tells Von Luger that it is the sworn duty of every officer to attempt escape. In reality, there was no requirement in the King's Regulations, or in any form of international convention.

The film shows the tunnel codenamed Tom with its entrance under a stove and Harry's in a drain sump in a washroom. In reality, Dick's entrance was the drain sump, Harry's was under the stove, and Tom's was in a darkened corner next to a stove chimney.

Former POWs asked the filmmakers to exclude details about the help they received from their home countries, such as maps, papers, and tools hidden in gift packages, lest it jeopardise future POW escapes. The filmmakers complied.

The film omits any mention that many Germans willingly helped in the escape itself. The film suggests that the forgers were able to make near-exact replicas of just about any pass that was used in Nazi Germany. In reality, the forgers received a great deal of assistance from Germans who lived many hundreds of miles away on the other side of the country. Several German guards, who were openly anti-Nazi, also willingly gave the prisoners items and assistance of any kind to aid their escape.

The need for such accuracy produced much eyestrain, but unlike in the film, there were no cases of blindness. Some, such as Frank Knight, gave up forging because of the strain, but he certainly did not suffer the same ocular fate as the character of Colin Blythe in the film. In fact, no one in the film says that Colin Blythe's blindness is the result of eyestrain. He identifies his problem as "progressive myopia", suggesting that he has not only heard of the condition but has also been diagnosed.

The film depicts the escape taking place in ideal weather conditions, whereas at the time much was done in freezing temperatures, and snow lay thick on the ground. In reality there were no escapes by aircraft or motorcycle: McQueen requested the motorcycle sequence, which shows off his skills as a keen motorcyclist. He did the stunt riding himself (except for the final jump, done by Bud Ekins). Although 76 POWs escaped the film only shows about 30 escaping through the tunnel.

In the film, Hilts incapacitates, or otherwise kills, a German soldier for his motorcycle, Ashley-Pitt kills Kuhn, a Gestapo officer, when he recognizes Bartlett waiting to pass through a Gestapo checkpoint at a railway station and Hendley knocks out a German guard at the airfield. Sedgwick  witnesses the killing of German officers at a French Cafe by the French resistance. No German personnel were killed or injured by the escapees.

The movie shows three truckloads of recaptured POWs splitting off in three directions. One truck contains 20 of the prisoners who are invited to stretch their legs in a field, whereupon they are all machine gunned in a single massacre, with the implication that the other two have the same manner; in reality, the POWs were shot individually or in pairs. The majority of the POWs were killed by pistol shots taken by Gestapo officers; however, at least ten of them were killed in a manner like that portrayed in the film: Dutchy Swain, Chaz Hall, Brian Evans, Wally Valenta, George McGill, Pat Langford, Edgar Humphreys, Adam Kolanowski, Bob Stewart and Henry "Hank" Birkland.

In addition, the film depicts the three prisoners who escape to freedom as British, Polish, and Australian; in reality, they were Norwegian (Jens Müller and Per Bergsland) and Dutch (Bram van der Stok).

In 2009, seven POWs returned to Stalag Luft III for the 65th anniversary of the escape and watched the film. According to the veterans, many details of the first half depicting life in the camp were authentic, e.g. the death of Ives, who tries to scale the fence, and the actual digging of the tunnels.

The film has kept the memory of the 50 executed airmen alive for decades and has made their story known worldwide, if in a distorted form. British author Guy Walters notes that a pivotal scene in the film where MacDonald blunders by replying in English to a suspicious Gestapo officer saying, "Good luck", is now so strongly imprinted that historians have accepted it as a real event, and that it was Bushell's partner Bernard Scheidhauer who made the error. However, Walters points out that an historical account says that one of the two men said "yes" in English in response to a Kripo man's questions without any mention of "good luck" and notes that as Scheidhauser was French, and Bushell's first language was English, it seems likely that if a slip did take place, it was made by Bushell himself, and says the "good luck" scene should be regarded as fiction.

Music
The film's iconic music was composed by Elmer Bernstein, who gave each major character their own musical motif based on the Great Escape's main theme. Its enduring popularity helped Bernstein live off the score's royalties for the rest of his life. Critics have said the film score succeeds because it uses rousing militaristic motifs with interludes of warmer softer themes that humanizes the prisoners and endears them to audiences; the music also captures the bravery and defiance of the POWs. The main title's patriotic march has since become popular in Britain, particularly with sports such as fans of the England national football team. However, in 2016, the sons of Elmer Bernstein openly criticized the use of the Great Escape theme by the Vote Leave campaign in the UK Brexit referendum, saying "Our father would never have allowed UKIP to use his music" because he would have strongly opposed the party.

Intrada Records (release)
In 2011 Intrada, a company specializing in film soundtracks, released a digitized re-mastered version of the full film score based on the original 1/4" two-track stereo sessions and original 1/2" three-channel stereo masters.

Disc one

Disc two

Disc three

Reception

Box office
The Great Escape grossed $11.7 million at the box office, after a budget of $4 million. It became one of the highest-grossing films of 1963, despite heavy competition. In the years since its release, its audience has broadened, cementing its status as a cinema classic. It was entered into the 3rd Moscow International Film Festival, where McQueen won the Silver Prize for Best Actor.

Critical response
Contemporary reviews for the film were mostly positive.  In 1963, The New York Times critic Bosley Crowther wrote: "But for much longer than is artful or essential, The Great Escape grinds out its tormenting story without a peek beneath the surface of any man, without a real sense of human involvement. It's a strictly mechanical adventure with make-believe men." British film critic Leslie Halliwell described it as "pretty good but overlong POW adventure with a tragic ending". The Time magazine reviewer wrote in 1963: "The use of colour photography is unnecessary and jarring, but little else is wrong with this film. With accurate casting, a swift screenplay, and authentic German settings, Producer-Director John Sturges has created classic cinema of action. There is no sermonizing, no soul probing, no sex. The Great Escape is simply great escapism".

Modern appraisals
The Great Escape continues to receive acclaim from modern critics. On review aggregator Rotten Tomatoes, the film holds an approval rating of 94% based on 53 reviews. The site's critics consensus reads, "With its impeccably slow-building story and a cast for the ages, The Great Escape is an all-time action classic."

In a 2006 poll in the United Kingdom, regarding the family film that television viewers would most want to see on Christmas Day, The Great Escape came in third, and was first among the choices of male viewers. In an article for the British Film Institute, "10 great prisoner of war films", updated in August 2018, Samuel Wigley wrote that watching films like The Great Escape and the 1955 British film The Colditz Story,  "for all their moments of terror and tragedy, is to delight in captivity in times of war as a wonderful game for boys, an endless Houdini challenge to slip through the enemy's fingers. Often based on true stories of escape, they have the viewer marvelling at the ingenuity and seemingly unbreakable spirit of imprisoned soldiers." He described The Great Escape as "the epitome of the war-is-fun action film", which became "a fixture of family TV viewing".

Accolades
 Nominated Academy Award for Film Editing (Ferris Webster)
 Nominated Golden Globe Award for Best Picture
 Winner Moscow International Film Festival Best Actor (Steve McQueen)
 Nominated Moscow International Film Festival Grand Prix (John Sturges)
 Selected National Board of Review Top Ten Films of Year
 Nominated Writers Guild of America Best Written American Drama (James Clavell, W. R. Burnett) (Screenplay Adaptation)
 19th place in AFI's 100 Years...100 Thrills

Legacy
On 24 March 2014, the 70th anniversary of the escape, the RAF staged a commemoration of the escape attempt, with 50 serving personnel each carrying a photograph of one of the shot men.

On 24 March 2019, the RAF held another event for the 75th anniversary of the escape. There was a screening of the film at London's Eventim Hammersmith Apollo, hosted by Dan Snow. The film was simulcast with other cinemas throughout the UK.

Other media

Sequel

A fictional, made-for-television sequel, The Great Escape II: The Untold Story, was released in 1988, with different actors including Christopher Reeve in the leading role, and directed by Jud Taylor (who played 2nd Lt. Goff in the 1963 film). The film is not a true sequel, as it dramatizes the escape itself just as the original film does, although mostly using the real names of the individuals involved (whereas the original film fictionalized them and used composite characters). It depicts the search for the culprits responsible for the murder of the 50 Allied officers. Donald Pleasence appears in a supporting role as a member of the SS.

Video games
Two video games have been released based on the film:
 The Great Escape (1986) was released for the Commodore 64, ZX Spectrum and DOS platforms, and shares a title and similar plot to the movie. The game follows an unnamed prisoner of war who has been interned in a POW camp somewhere in northern Germany in 1942.
 The Great Escape (2003) was released for Microsoft Windows, Xbox and PlayStation 2. The plotline follows that of the film, except there are also levels featuring some of the characters' first captures and early escape attempts, as well as a changed ending.

In popular culture
 The film is mentioned and heavily referenced in Metal Gear Solid 3: Snake Eater.
 The films Chicken Run, Reservoir Dogs, the 1998 remake of The Parent Trap, Top Secret!, Charlie's Angels, The Tao of Steve, and Naked Gun 33 1/3: The Final Insult, Inglorious Bastards all contain references or homages to the film.
 Monty Python's Flying Circus, The Simpsons, Hogan's Heroes, Nash Bridges, Seinfeld, Get Smart, Fugget About It, Archer, Goodness Gracious Me, Shaun the Sheep, and Red Dwarf have all parodied or paid homage to the film.
 Bernstein's Great Escape theme tune has been taken up by the Pukka Pies England Band, a small brass band who have played in the crowd at England football team matches since 1996. They released an arrangement of the theme as a single for the 1998 FIFA World Cup and a newer version for UEFA Euro 2000.

See also
 List of American films of 1963
 The Bridge on the River Kwai

Notes

References

Bibliography
  Details the manhunt by the Royal Air Force's special investigations unit after the war to find and bring to trial the perpetrators of the "Sagan murders".
 
 
 
 
 
  Memoir by the surviving Norwegian escapee.
  Story of Wing Commander Harry "Wings" Day.

External links

 
 
 
 
 
 James Garner Interview on the Charlie Rose Show  (See 30:23–34:47 of video.)
 New publication with private photos of the shooting & documents of 2nd unit cameraman Walter Riml
 Photos of the filming
 The Great Escape locations
 Rob Davis web site on the Great Escape
 

1963 films
1963 war films
1960s adventure drama films
1960s prison films
1960s war drama films
Adventure films based on actual events
American adventure drama films
American epic films
American prison drama films
American war drama films
Drama films based on actual events
Epic films based on actual events
Films scored by Elmer Bernstein
Films about shot-down aviators
Films about the United States Army Air Forces
Films about the British Armed Forces
Films about World War II crimes
Films based on works by Paul Brickhill
Films directed by John Sturges
Films set in Germany
Films set in 1943
Films set in 1944
Historical epic films
Films about prison escapes
Films with screenplays by James Clavell
United Artists films
1960s war adventure films
World War II films based on actual events
World War II prisoner of war films
American war adventure films
1960s English-language films
1960s American films
Films about capital punishment